Elections in Guatemala include, on the national level, a head of state – the president – and a unicameral legislature. 
Guatemala's president and vice-president are elected on one ballot for a four-year term by the people.

The Congress of the Republic (Congreso de la República) has 158 members, elected for a four-year term, partially in multi-member departmental constituencies and partially by proportional representation both using the D'Hondt method.

Guatemala also elects deputies to the supranational Central American Parliament.

Political culture 

Political parties in Guatemala are generally numerous and unstable. No party has won the presidency more than once. In every election period the majority of the parties are small and newly formed.

Schedule

Election

Inauguration

See also
 Politics of Guatemala

References

External links
Adam Carr's Election Archive